Netterden is a village in the Dutch province of Gelderland. It is located in the municipality of Oude IJsselstreek, about 5 km northeast of Emmerich am Rhein in Germany.

Netterden was a separate municipality until 1821, when it was merged with Bergh. The village has a border crossing to Emmerich am Rhein. The Netterdenscher Kanal is the border canal separating both countries.

History 
It was first mentioned in 1218 as Netterthen. The etymology is unclear. The village of Nütterden is just across the border. In 1840, it was home to 350 people. In 2011, a little Lady chapel appeared in Netterden. It is unclear who made and placed it there.

Gallery

References

Populated places in Gelderland
Former municipalities of Gelderland
Oude IJsselstreek